The 2004 Thurrock Council election took place on 10 June 2004 to elect members of Thurrock Council in Essex, England. The whole council was up for election with boundary changes since the last election in 2002. The Conservative party gained overall control of the council from the Labour party.

Election result
The results saw the Conservatives win control of the council, which Labour had run before the election with 33 of the 49 seats. The Conservatives gained 18 seats while Labour lost 14.

Ward results

References

2004
2004 English local elections
2000s in Essex